Robert Jan "Bob" Ctvrtlik (
born July 8, 1963) is an American volleyball player, Olympic gold medalist, businessman and former member of the International Olympic Committee. He is a 1985 graduate of Pepperdine University.

Early life 
Bob Ctvrtlik was born in Long Beach, California to Margaret and Josef Ctvrtlik. He has two older brothers, Jeffrey and David. Their father, a native of Czechoslovakia's Moravian region, was a graduate of Charles University in Prague and knew eight languages. He was imprisoned for three months during the German occupation for refusing to serve as a translator. Josef left his country in 1948 by taking a train from Prague to Bratislava and then skiing to Austria with three friends. After 18 months in West Germany and five years in New Zealand working as a wool buyer, he moved to California in 1955 and worked as a professor at California State University, Long Beach (Long Beach State) before his death in 1983 from colon cancer. Bob Ctvrtlik graduated from Pepperdine University in 1985.

Playing career
Playing for Pepperdine, Ctvrtlik was the Most Valuable Player in NCAA volleyball in 1985. He also played for Long Beach State in 1983-1984, where he earned all-league honors. In 1982-1983, he was a member of the Long Beach City College Vikings Men's Volleyball team, playing under Vikings head coach Gary Jacobson, where he and longtime friend and doubles partner, Allan Treffry, won the volleyball championship for the State of California. They would eventually be ranked number one in the United States. Ctvrtlik earned all league honors and was awarded the most valuable player in the state championship tournament.

Ctvrtlik subsequently played a year for Long Beach State, under 49ers (now Beach) coach Ray Ratelle. After one year, he transferred to Pepperdine, to play his final collegiate year under the leadership and guidance of coaching legend Marv Dunphy, winning both the NCAA Title and personally, the NCAA's Most Valuable Player Award.

After a successful college volleyball career, Ctvrtlik followed Dunphy to the United States national team, where he quickly earned a starting position. In the 1988 Olympic Games in Seoul, South Korea, Ctvrtlik, playing opposite volleyball legend, Karch Kiraly, earned a gold medal by defeating the Soviet Union in the finals. For several years, Ctvrtlik played professionally in Italy, including winning the well-respected Euro-professional league championship. He returned to the United States Olympic team in preparation for the 1992 Summer Olympics during which time he was awarded the most valuable player in the world on two separate occasions. Competing as team captain in Barcelona, he became one of the colorful "bald eagles" as all of the U.S. men's team players shaved their heads in protest of alleged officiating misconduct. The U.S. team defeated Cuba in the consolation match to take home the bronze medal.

After the Barcelona games, Ctvrtlik returned to Europe to play in the Italian professional league.  He would return to once again join the U.S. national team in preparation for the 1996 Summer Olympics in Atlanta. Ctvrtlik is credited with improving the team's world ranking from 15th to 4th within a mere 10 months of his return. Ctvrtlik was again awarded the Best Player in the World honor in 1995 but the U.S. men's team would finish a disappointing 7th in the Atlanta Olympics.

Throughout his Olympic years, Ctvrtlik also maintained a highly successful beach career, being one of the top stars on the professional four-man circuit. He also earned the coveted "AAA" beach rating on numerous occasions while playing on the two-man circuit. He retired from volleyball after the 1996 Olympic games.

After volleyball
In 1996, Ctvrtlik was elected to the International Olympic Committee (IOC) Athlete's Commission and then re-elected for an eight-year term at the 2000 Summer Olympics. He was appointed to the IOC in 1999. He was a founding board member of the World Anti-Doping Agency (WADA) and served on the IOC Reform Committee. By 2010, he was no longer a member of the IOC but was a strategic advisor to the athlete career program.

Ctvrtlik's business concerns include real estate rehabilitation projects as President of Green Street Properties, LLC in Huntington Beach, California, and import-exports, via his company, the Ciram Corporation.

Bob Ctvrtlik is an avid skier, basketball player and tennis player. He and his wife Cosette have three sons – Josef, Erik, and Matthew. The family resides on Balboa Island, Newport Beach, California. Erik and Josef, a member of Corona del Mar's varsity team, continue to play volleyball. His son Matthew, who also played for Corona del Mar, will be playing for Harvard starting in fall.

References

External links
Bob Ctvrtklik wins 2010 Wilson Distinguished Service Award
USOC Press release bio

1963 births
Living people
American men's volleyball players
American people of Moravian descent
Long Beach State Beach men's volleyball players
Olympic bronze medalists for the United States in volleyball
Olympic gold medalists for the United States in volleyball
Volleyball players from Long Beach, California
Pepperdine Waves men's volleyball players
Volleyball players at the 1988 Summer Olympics
Volleyball players at the 1992 Summer Olympics
Volleyball players at the 1996 Summer Olympics
Medalists at the 1988 Summer Olympics
Medalists at the 1992 Summer Olympics
International Olympic Committee members
World Anti-Doping Agency members
Goodwill Games medalists in volleyball
Competitors at the 1986 Goodwill Games
Charles University alumni